The Carolina Crusher was one of the most powerful winter storms on record in parts of North Carolina. The storm hit Central Virginia on January 25, 2000, causing thousands of power outages within the area leaving 11 inches in Richmond, VA and 20.3 inches in Raleigh-Durham International Airport before moving out to the Atlantic.

Meteorological History
The storm occurred during a mild winter with below-average snowfall across much of the East Coast. The major storm portion began on Friday January 21st; snow started falling on Wednesday. At the time many computer models suggested an area of low pressure would develop and track up the East Coast after getting energy from another low pressure system in Canada. But over the weekend, some computer models began to distort the rare idea of a formation with two low-pressure systems colliding and building up quickly. Most meteorologists thought to rename the event as a part of the Big Storm which was occurring in Canada at the time. In fact, most forecasters stopped mentioning snow by Monday January 24th. It turned out the Canadian storm helped build it up. Therefore, the storm's low-pressure system came from the Northern great lakes, entered over Appalachia, strengthened considerably and went into the North again to collide with the warm front that was approaching.

A dip in the jet stream had created a trough which was causing rain in northern Florida with snow in Georgia. By the morning of the 24th, it was located in the northeastern Gulf of Mexico near Apalachicola, Florida. By the evening of the 24th, the storm was rapidly intensifying against the South Carolina coast. By Tuesday January 25th, it was near Hatteras, North Carolina. The storm moved northeastwards along the Atlantic Seaboard. Later on in the day it was located 80 miles east of Long Beach Island, New Jersey. It then began to weaken and by the next morning on the 26th, it was located just east of Portland, Maine. The storm was poorly forecasted because of the other simultaneous storm events and awkward build-up of two low pressure systems.

Progression of the Storm

Northern territories 
In Pennsylvania, this storm was the most significant winter storm since the Blizzard of 1996.  Progress throughout the northern territories were significantly more damaging due to high-winds, wet snow and sleet.  There was sleet and freezing rain mixed in with the snow across Southeast Pennsylvania.  Naturally businesses, schools, airports and government offices were closed on the 25th. Most municipalities declared the standard snow emergencies where accidents, traffic hazards and power outages occur.  There were at least three confirmed deaths from heart attacks shoveling snow. About 2,000 homes and businesses lost power, mainly in the Philadelphia area.   Snowfall rates of around 2 inches per hour were common during the first couple hours of this storm. Because of a warm front the following morning, it changed into sleet then freezing rain.  It collided with a warm front in the northern territories.

Snowfall rates of around 2 inches per hour were common during the first couple of hours during this storm. Some locations already had 4 inches of new snow on the ground. In Delaware, the change from wet to heavy dry snow helped cut down on the number of damages. The state of New Jersey got accumulation of about 6 to 15 inches of snow, sleet and freezing rain, wind gusts as strong as 60 mph along the shore, moderate coastal flooding and drifts as high as four feet. For the first time since 1996 county and government offices were closed. Many businesses and all schools were closed. Many malls never opened and all the others closed early. Snowfall rates of around 2 inches per hour were common during the first couple of hours during this storm. Some locations already had 4 inches of new snow on the ground due to the warmer air current above the ground and the precipitation intensity slackened, the snow began mixing with and changing over to sleet and freezing rain in the central and southern part of the state. Snow continued across northwest New Jersey, but its intensity was lighter during the late morning and afternoon hours. Central and Southern New Jersey spent most of the daylight hours in the storm's dry area – an area of lighter precipitation. The change to snow coincided with one last band of heavier snow that affected in New Jersey during the evening of the 25th. The snow ended around Midnight on the 26th. The winter storm caused numerous accidents around the region. There was significant wind recorded, in the southwestern territories the wind was not as severe.  In Richmond, Virginia the snow fell as sleet then immediately turned into dry snow due to a high pressure system entering the eye of the vortex.  The power-outages came late the following week due to the rise in temperatures with the snow already on the ground becoming wet snow.

Loss and Damages
In most of Pennsylvania 5–6 inches fell. The low-pressure was still dry in the south of Pennsylvania. In the south the mix started to change to sleet first and then snow. Precipitation was mainly snow with a little sleet mixed in around Philadelphia during the evening. The change to mainly snow coincided with another heavier band of precipitation that affected Eastern Pennsylvania during the evening of the 25th. The snow in Pennsylvania was wet snow due to temperatures close to freezing at the surface.

Raleigh and other areas of North Carolina were shut down for many days due to large amounts of snow remaining and poor road conditions.

Total Accumulations

Pennsylvania and Delaware
Total Accumulations included: in New Castle County 10 inches at the New Castle County Airport; in Kent County 11 inches in Woodside and Dover, 9 inches in Milford and 8 inches in Viola; in Sussex County 8.5 inches in Georgetown, 8 inches in Seaford, 6.5 inches in Lewes, 6 inches in Laurel and 5 inches in Rehoboth Beach. Total Accumulations (going from northwest to southeast across the region) included: in Monroe County 13 inches in Saylorsburg, 11 inches in Long Pond, 10 inches in Bossardsville and East Stroudsburg, 7 inches in Scotia and 6.5 inches in Pocono Summit; in Northampton County, 14 inches in Williams Township and 7 inches in Bath; in Lehigh County 10 inches at the Lehigh Valley International Airport, 7 inches in Allentown; in Berks County 11 inches at the Blue Marsh Lake, 10 inches in Morgantown and Vinemont, 8 inches in Kutztown and Lincoln Park; in Chester County 12 inches in Kennett Square and West Barlborough Township, 11 inches in Downingtown and West Chester, 9 inches in Coatesville and 8 inches in Honey Brook and Glenmoore; in Montgomery County 14 inches at the Willow Grove NAS, 12 inches in Wynnewood, 11.5 inches in Norristown, 11 inches in King of Prussia and 7 inches in Pottstown; in Bucks County 13.6 inches in Chalfont, 12.5 inches in Furlong, 12 inches in Doylestown and 9 inches in Springtown and Langhorne; in Delaware County 11 inches in Springfield and 9 inches at the Philadelphia International Airport.

New Jersey
Total Accumulations included (going from the northwest to southeast across the state): in Sussex County 15 inches in High Point, 14.7 inches in Culver Lake, 13.5 inches in Wantage, 9.5 inches in Sparta and 8 inches in Sussex; in Warren County 12 inches in Phillipsburg and 11 inches in Allamuchy; in Morris County 12 inches in Oak Ridge, 11 inches in Long Valley, 9 inches in Whippany and Rockaway and 6 inches in Madison; in Hunterdon County 13 inches in White House Station, 11.5 inches in Califon and 10 inches in Flemington and Wertsville; in Somerset County 10.5 inches in Neshanic, 10 inches in Pottersville and 9 inches in Branchburg and Somerville, in Middlesex County 6 inches in New Brunswick and Woodbridge, in Monmouth County 7 inches in Ocean Grove and Manasquan, 6 inches in Howell and Union Beach; in Mercer County 10 inches in Washington's Crossing, 8 inches in Princeton and Hightstown; in Burlington County 13 inches in Moorestown, 10 inches in Lumberton and Marlton, 9 inches in Mount Laurel and 7 inches in Bordentown; in Ocean County 10 inches in Brick, 9 inches in Brant Beach and 8 inches in Jackson; in Camden County 14 inches in Gloucester City, 11 inches in Somerdale, 10 inches in Pennsauken and 8 inches in Cherry Hill; in Gloucester County 13 inches in Sewell and Mullica Hill, 11.5 inches in Swedesboro; in Salem County 10.3 inches in Deepwater; in Cumberland County 9 inches in Seabrook, 8 inches in Millville and 7 inches in Vineland; in Atlantic County 10 inches in Pomona, 9 inches in Estell Manor and 8.3 inches at the Atlantic City International Airport and in Cape May County 10 inches in North Wildwood, 8.5 inches in Cape May City and 8 inches in Cape May Courthouse.

North Carolina
Total accumulations included (going from west to east): 2 inches in Gastonia, 10 inches in Charlotte, 20 inches in Monroe, 9 inches in Kannapolis, 5 inches in Salisbury, 7 inches in Winston-Salem, 15 inches in Asheboro, 10 inches in Greensboro, 16 inches in Sanford, 14 inches in Carrboro, 16 inches in Chapel Hill, 18 inches in Durham, 16 inches in Fayetteville, 24 inches in Raleigh, 10 inches in Smithfield, 8 inches in Rocky Mount, 5 inches in Wilmington, 8 inches in Tarboro, 4 inches in Jacksonville, and 2 inches in New Bern. The Outer Banks received rain with the system and the mountains did not receive any precipitation.

References

External links
Record Snow Blankets the Region
January 25, 2000 Winter Storm

Blizzards in the United States
2000 meteorology
2000 natural disasters in the United States
Natural disasters in North Carolina
Natural disasters in Virginia
2000 in North Carolina
2000 in Virginia
January 2000 events in North America